The Tangahoe Formation is a geologic formation in the southwestern North Island of New Zealand.

It becomes exposed at its western end close to the Tasman Sea coast near Hawera in a series of cliff faces. The formation takes its name from the Tangahoe River, close to the exposed cliffs.

The formation is sedimentary, composed largely of muddy sandstones, and was formed beneath sea level in the Waipipian stage of the mid-Pliocene some 3.4 to 3.0 million years ago.

The formation is an important fossil site. Many marine fossils have been recovered from its mudstones, including the megalodon shark, giant petrel Macronectes tinae, penguin Eudyptes atatu, monk seal Eomonachus belegaerensis, and cetaceans.

References

Geologic formations of New Zealand
Landforms of Taranaki